Étangs de Neych are a group of ponds at Siguer in the Ariège department, France.

Neych